Wally Hunter is the current Managing Director of EnerTech Capital.  Prior to EnerTech, Wally worked for the Royal Bank of Canada where he managed the bank's private equities for energy and advanced technologies. Wally has been investing in energy and clean energy companies and projects for 20 years. Wally runs EnerTech's Canadian operations from Toronto. His specific areas of interest and responsibility include opportunities in Mobility, alternative fuels and storage, power quality and conversion, water re-use in energy, Wind turbine technologies, power electronics, advanced materials, motor controls, automation and sensors. Wally has an extensive background in the venture capital business which includes a series of successful IPO's, M&A and turnaround transactions throughout his 25-year career in the finance business. In addition, Wally previously produced and hosted the weekly financial television show "Money Week" which featured over 200 guest interviews from Canadian and U.S. money managers over a 14-year period. Wally was also previously involved in politics and sat as a local Councilor in the town of Milton, Ontario (3 terms) and on the board of the Ontario College of Pharmacists (Chair of finance).Wally was past Chairman of the Banff Venture Forum Cleantech Stream and Chairman of the 2014 Canadian Venture Capital Association conference in Ottawa in May 2014. He sits on the board of the Canadian Venture Capital Association (CVCA), Venture Capital Association of Alberta (VCAA), Sustainable Development Technology Canada Member Council (SDTC) and the Cleantech Group Advisory Board. Wally currently sits on the boards of EnerTech portfolio companies, IPKeys Power Partners, Western Oilfield Equipment Ltd, Vertex, Sofdesk and Powerside. Wally was previously an observer on the Board of Distech Controls (sold to Acuity Brands for $318 Million CDN) and sat on the board of HPC Energy Services (sold to TriWest in 2018). In 2017 Wally was appointed to the NHL Coaches Association Advisory Board. In 2018, Wally was appointed to the Advisory Board at Cornell University/Tech's Program in Infrastructure Policy (CPIP).

Recent achievements 

As for recent achievements Wally was past Chairman of the Banff, Alberta Venture Forum Cleantech Stream and Chairman of the 2014 Canadian Venture Capital Association conference in Ottawa in May, 2014. He sits on the boards of both the CVCA and the Venture Capital Association of Alberta (VCAA) as well as EnerTech's portfolio companies Enbala Power Networks, FilterBoxx and n-Dimension Solutions. Wally is an observer on the boards of HPC Energy and Distech Controls.

Education 

Wally received a BA from the University of Western Ontario and has completed a number of securities-related courses and programs including the Canadian Securities Institute (CSC program) and Canadian Investment Finance (CIF I, II and III).

References

External links
 www.enertechcapital.com

Canadian business executives
Living people
Canadian television producers
Year of birth missing (living people)